Margie Mahoney (born May 12, 1952) is an American cross-country skier. She competed at the 1972 Winter Olympics and the 1976 Winter Olympics.

References

External links
 

1952 births
Living people
American female cross-country skiers
Olympic cross-country skiers of the United States
Cross-country skiers at the 1972 Winter Olympics
Cross-country skiers at the 1976 Winter Olympics
Sportspeople from Anchorage, Alaska
21st-century American women